Live Like a Cop, Die Like a Man is a 1976 Italian poliziotteschi crime film, directed by Ruggero Deodato and starring Marc Porel and Ray Lovelock.

Cast
 Marc Porel as Fred
 Ray Lovelock as Tony
 Adolfo Celi as The Boss
 Franco Citti as Rudy Ruginski
 Silvia Dionisio as Norma
 Marino Masé as Rick Conti
 Renato Salvatori as Roberto Pasquini, a.k.a. Bibi
 Sergio Ammirata as Sergeant
 Bruno Corazzari as Morandi
 Daniele Dublino as Corrupt police inspector
 Sofia Dionisio as Lina Pasquini (credited as "Flavia Fabiani")
 Tom Felleghy as Major
 Margherita Horowitz as Mona, a hostage woman
 Gina Mascetti as Maricca
 Marcello Monti as 3rd kidnapper
 Claudio Nicastro as Commissioner
 Gino Pagnani as Paul, the dog trainer
 Enzo Pulcrano as Mario, Pasquini's henchman
 Alvaro Vitali as Concierge at Pasquini's building

Production
Live Like a Cop, Die Like a Man was based on a screenplay by Fernando Di Leo, originally titled Poliziotti si nasce poliziotti si muore (Born a Cop, Die a Cop). The film was director Ruggero Deodato's only film in the poliziotteschi genre.

Release
Live Like a Cop, Die Like a Man was released on 11 March 1976. It has grossed 741,142,540 lira domestically. The film was censored on its initial release in Italy. The cut scene involved a scene with Renato Salvatori's character Bibi who has his men gouge out the eyes of a thug played by Bruno Corazzari, and then crush the eyeball under his feet.

See also 
 List of Italian films of 1976

Notes

Further reading

External links

1976 films
1976 crime films
1970s Italian-language films
Giallo films
Films directed by Ruggero Deodato
Poliziotteschi films
Buddy drama films
1970s Italian films